2014 Czech Lion Awards ceremony was held on 14 January 2015. Fair Play received highest number of nominations but eventually failed to win in any category. The Way Out on the other hand won 7 awards, including Best Film category.

Winners and nominees

Non-statutory Awards
 Best Film Poster
Fair Play
 Film Fans Award
Fair Play
 Magnesie Award for Best Student Film
A Righteous Choice

References

2014 film awards
Czech Lion Awards ceremonies